Biysky District is an administrative and municipal  district (raion), one of the fifty-nine in Altai Krai, Russia. It is located in the east of the krai and borders with Zonalny, Tselinny, Soltonsky, Krasnogorsky, Sovetsky, and Smolensky Districts, as well as with the territory of the City of Biysk. Its administrative center is the city of Biysk (which is not administratively a part of the district). District's population:

Geography
Biysky District is located in the eastern part of the krai, in the southern part of Biysko-Chumyshskaya Highland. The terrain is rugged and people extract sand and gravel.

The Biya, Katun, Bekhtemir, Shubenka, and Nenya Rivers flow through the district. Pines, birches, aspens, alders, sorbus, viburnum, bird cherries, and poplar grow in this area.

History
The district was established on May 27, 1924 as one of the eighteen districts comprising Biysky Uyezd of Altai Governorate. The district was abolished and merged into newly formed Zonalny District on October 5, 1939. On February 1, 1963, Zonalny District was abolished, merged with Krasnogorsky and Soltonsky Districts, as well as with the parts of Marushensky District, and established once more as Biysky District.

Administrative and municipal status
Within the framework of administrative divisions, Biysky District is one of the fifty-nine in the krai. The city of Biysk serves as its administrative center, despite being incorporated separately as a city of krai significance—an administrative unit with the status equal to that of the districts.

As a municipal division, the district is incorporated as Biysky Municipal District. The city of krai significance of Biysk is incorporated separately from the district as Biysk Urban Okrug.

Economy
The basic economy in the district is farming, including the production of grain, sugar beets, milk, meat, and livestock.

Climate
The climate is continental with the average January temperature being  and the average July temperature being .

References

Notes

Sources

Districts of Altai Krai
States and territories established in 1924
States and territories disestablished in 1939
States and territories established in 1963